Edward Arthur Meyer (27 January 1907 – 5 June 1981) was a New Zealand professional rugby league footballer who played in the 1930s.

International honours
Meyer represented New Zealand in 1930 against Australia.

References

External links

Search for "Edward" at rugbyleagueproject.org
Search for "Ted" at rugbyleagueproject.org
Search for "Ed" at rugbyleagueproject.org
Search for "Arthur" at rugbyleagueproject.org
Search for "Meyer" at rugbyleagueproject.org

New Zealand national rugby league team players
New Zealand rugby league players
Northland rugby league team players
Place of birth missing
Rugby league five-eighths
1907 births
1981 deaths